Ardley is a hamlet in central Alberta, Canada within Red Deer County. The community's name may be a transfer from Ardley, England.

Ardley's population was enumerated at 16 in the last census, and the community is considered a ghost town.

Demographics 
Ardley recorded a population of 17 in the 1991 Census of Population conducted by Statistics Canada.

See also 
List of communities in Alberta
List of hamlets in Alberta

References

Hamlets in Alberta
Red Deer County
Ghost towns in Alberta